Wylie High School may refer to:

Wylie High School (Abilene, Texas) —, United States
Wylie High School (Wylie, Texas) —, United States